Qurbatain is a Pakistani drama serial which aired on Hum TV. The serial is directed by Kamran Akbar Khan, written by Rizwan Ahmad and produced by Momina Duraid Productions, it stars Shahbaz Shigri, Anmol Baloch, Komal Sajid, Ahmad Taha Ghani.

Plot 
The story revolves around two companions Zamal Areeba. Zamal belongs to a wealthy family whereas Areeba belongs to a white-collar class family. Areeba and Zamal are best friends until an attractive person turns into the explanation of their conflicts. Faaris marries Areeba and Zamal didn't know about this. Faaris also marries Zamal on her parents wish. Zamal asked Areeba to marry her brother Rohaan. Areeba gets engaged to Rohaan. Later on Rohaan's best friend Rafail gets to know that Areeba and Faaris are married. He invites Rohaan to his house and when they both are in the car, they caught Areeba with Faaris. When Zamal's gets to know that Faaris is married with her best friend Areeba, she gets dishearted. In the last episodes, Areeba leaves Faaris and stays in the house of her cousin. Faaris returns to his parents house while Areeba's cousin leaves Areeba and also leaves Pakistan.

Cast 

 Shahbaz Shigiri as Faaris
 Anmol Baloch as Areeba
 Komal Meer as Zamal
 Ahmad Taha Ghani as Rohaan
 Areej Mohyudin as Sadia
 Zain Afzal as Rafail
 Kashif Mehmood as Waaris
 Laila Zuberi as Munazzah
 Abbas Ashraf Awan as Khurram 
 Munazzah Arif as Shumaila
 Tahira Imam as mother of Areeba and Sadia
 Laiba Sarfaraz as Manahil

Production 
The production location of the serial was Islamabad.

References 

Pakistani television sitcoms
Pakistani drama television series
Comedy-drama television series
Urdu-language television shows
2020 Pakistani television series debuts
2020s Pakistani television series